Seidenfadenia (abbreviated Sei.) is a genus of flowering plants from the orchid family, Orchidaceae.  

Seidenfadenia and another orchid genus, Gunnarella, are named for Danish botanist Gunnar Seidenfaden. At present (June 2014), there is only one known species, Seidenfadenia mitrata, native to Thailand and to Myanmar (Burma). This species shows a pendent growth habit. The leaves are slender and succulent and reach lengths of up to 30 cm. The inflorescences are erect racemes or panicles with 17 to 52 pink or white flowers (average of 30). The inflorescences are usually shorter than the leaves. The most common flower morph shows pink colouration of the labellum and anther cap.

See also
 List of Orchidaceae genera

References

External links
Internet Orchid Species Photo Encyclopedia
Dokmai Dogma, Thoughts and Advice from a Tropical Botanical Garden in Chiang Mai, Thailand: Seidenfadenia – a fantastic orchid!
Species Specific, Seidenfadenia mitrata
Swiss Orchid Foundation at Herbarium Jany Renz, Seidenfadenia mitrata 

Orchids of Thailand
Orchids of Myanmar
Monotypic Epidendroideae genera
Vandeae genera
Aeridinae